The women's halfpipe competition of the 2013 FIS Snowboarding World Championships was held in Stoneham-et-Tewkesbury, Québec, Canada on January 19 & 20, 2013. 31 athletes from 13 countries competed.

Medalists

Results

Qualification
The following are the results of the qualification.

Semifinal

Final

References

Results

Halfpipe, women's